The 2022 Colorado State Treasurer election took place on November 8, 2022, to elect the Colorado State Treasurer. Incumbent Democratic Treasurer Dave Young won re-election to a second term.

Democratic primary

Candidates

Nominee
Dave Young, incumbent state treasurer

Results

Republican primary

Candidates

Nominee
Lang Sias, former state representative from the 27th district (2015–2019) and Republican nominee for lieutenant governor in 2018

Endorsements

Results

General election

Polling

Dave Young vs. generic Republican

Results

Notes

Partisan clients

References

External links
Official campaign websites
Lang Sias (R) for State Treasurer
Dave Young (D) for State Treasurer

State Treasurer
Colorado